Vacaville Transportation Center also known as the Vacaville Intermodal Station is a bus station in Vacaville, California, United States. It is served by Fairfield and Suisun Transit (FAST), Vacaville City Coach, and Yolobus.

Transit
The bus station is served by the FAST Blue Line between Pleasant Hill BART station, Fairfield Transportation Center, Davis, and Sacramento Monday through Saturday. Yolobus route 220 connects the VTC with Winters and Davis.

Local bus service is provided by Vacaville City Coach on lines 1, 3, 4, 5, and 6 which connect the center to Leisure Town, downtown Vacaville, Browns Valley, Kaiser Vacaville, Nut Tree, and Vacaville Transit Plaza.

History
In 2011 Phase 1 of the project was completed for $12.6 million. Phase 2 was to have added a $20.5 million 400-stall parking garage but this was later changed to a $1 million 136-space surface lot. In 2013 the center received $450,000 to improve sidewalks and build a bikepath. The center has no water fountains or bathroom facilities.

References

External links

Buildings and structures in Vacaville, California
Bus stations in Solano County, California